Bak Sung-wun (born 18 November 1940) is a North Korean speed skater. He competed in the men's 5000 metres event at the 1964 Winter Olympics.

References

1940 births
Living people
North Korean male speed skaters
Olympic speed skaters of North Korea
Speed skaters at the 1964 Winter Olympics
People from Hamhung